Powerlifting at the 2020 Summer Paralympics in Tokyo, Japan, was held at the Tokyo International Forum.

The 2020 Summer Olympic and Paralympic Games were postponed to 2021 due to the COVID-19 pandemic. They kept the 2020 name and were held from 24 August to 5 September 2021.

Qualification

Qualified nations

Medals
Source:

Medalists

Men's events

Women's events

See also
Weightlifting at the 2020 Summer Olympics

References

External links
Results book 

2020 Summer Paralympics events
International weightlifting competitions hosted by Japan
Paralympics